Ambassador Nina Lucine Hachigian (ret) is the first U.S. Special Representative for City and State Diplomacy. In this role, she seeks to bring benefits to, and learn from, local leaders in the United States, and connect them to counterparts around the world. 

Before rejoining the U.S. Department of State on October 3, 2022, she was the first Los Angeles Deputy Mayor of International Affairs, following her appointment by mayor Eric Garcetti. Her office expanded Los Angeles' global ties to help bring jobs, culture, visitors, and the 2028 Olympic and Paralympic Games to the city, and shared L.A.'s values and experience. 

Prior to this, Hachigian served as the United States Representative to the Association of Southeast Asian Nations ("ASEAN") with the rank of Ambassador Extraordinary and Plenipotentiary.

Biography 
Ambassador Nina Hachigian (ret) was appointed as the first U.S. Special Representative for City and State Diplomacy on October 3, 2022. The Special Representative for City and State Diplomacy and her team lead and coordinate the State Department’s engagement with mayors, governors and other local officials in the United States and around the world. The Special Representative aims to bring the benefits of U.S. foreign policy, such as jobs, investments, innovative solutions, and international experiences, to the local and state level. It supports U.S. national security priorities by integrating local ideas into foreign policy and fostering connections among cities, municipalities, and communities in the United States and abroad.

Prior to this, on August 4, 2017, Mayor Eric Garcetti announced the appointment of Ambassador Nina Hachigian as Deputy Mayor for International Affairs. In this role, she oversaw efforts that sent underserved community college students on free, educational international trips; created a new public-private partnership to attract international business and non-profits, especially to underserved communities; prepared the City for the 2028 Olympic and Paralympic Games and their legacy; hosted the Summit of the Americas; founded the first global gender equity city network; planned trade missions, and worked with international city networks to advance cutting-edge climate change programs, migrant integration, healthy cities and more.

From 2014 to 2017, Ambassador Hachigian served as the second U.S. Ambassador to the Association of Southeast Asian Nations (ASEAN). During her tenure, the United States established a strategic partnership with ASEAN, held the first Leaders' Summit in the United States, launched a Presidential initiative on economic cooperation, established the U.S.-ASEAN Women's Leadership Academy and grew the youth program to over 100,000 members. She was awarded the State Department's Superior Honor Award for her service. She is also a founder of WASA, Women Ambassadors Serving America, a group of some 200 current and former Ambassadors.

Earlier, Ambassador Hachigian was a senior fellow and a senior vice president at the Center for American Progress focused on Asia policy and U.S.-China relation. In 2012, she was the co-director of Asia policy for the Obama campaign.  Prior to that, Ambassador Hachigian was the director of the RAND Center for Asia Pacific Policy for four years.  Ambassador Hachigian served on the staff of the National Security Council in the Clinton White House from 1998-1999.

Ambassador Hachigian was a founding board member of the State Department's International Security Advisory Board. She is a board member of the Pacific Council on International Policy and a member of the Council on Foreign Relations. She is also a founder of the Leadership Council for Women in National Security (LC-WINS)

Hachigian received her B.S. from Yale University, magna cum laude, and her J.D. from Stanford Law School, with distinction. She lives in Los Angeles with her husband and children.

Published works 
Ambassador Hachigian is the editor of Debating China: The U.S. – China Relationship in Ten Conversations (Oxford University Press, 2014) and co-author of The Next American Century: How the U.S. Can Thrive as Other Powers Rise (Simon & Schuster, 2008).

Hachigian also published numerous reports, book chapters, and articles in outlets including Foreign Affairs, The Washington Quarterly, Democracy, and Survival, as well as opinion pieces appearing in TIME, The New York Times, Los Angeles Times, and the South China Morning Post. She also co-authored The Information Revolution in Asia (RAND, 2003). Ambassador Hachigian has been a guest on a variety of news programs.

Ambassadorship 
Ambassador Hachigian was sworn in as the United States Ambassador on September 19, 2014 and served until January 20, 2017.  In her capacity as Chief of the U.S. Mission to ASEAN, Ambassador Hachigian was responsible for working with ASEAN member states and other stakeholders to advance U.S. interests in a peaceful, prosperous, and integrated Southeast Asia that supports human dignity and a rules-based regional order.  The Mission's five priorities in the U.S. relationship with ASEAN are  supporting economic integration, expanding maritime cooperation, cultivating emerging leaders, promoting opportunity for women, and addressing transnational challenges. As U.S. Ambassador, Hachigian oversaw the broadening engagement of the United States in Southeast Asia, which included the Obama Administration's 2011 "pivot" or "rebalance" to the region. Based in the U.S. Mission to ASEAN in Jakarta, Indonesia, she traveled throughout ASEAN's 10 member states and Asia. Her responsibilities included supporting ASEAN as it moves toward economic integration in 2015 and advocating for the systemic changes necessary to promote peaceful and prosperous growth in the region.

Achievements during her term as ambassador include:
 YSEALI: In December 2013, President Obama launched the Young Southeast Asian Leader Initiative (YSEALI), a network for people-to-people ties that aims to improve U.S-ASEAN relations for generations to come. As of 2017, YSEALI has almost 100,000 members, ages 18–35, across all 10 ASEAN member states. The initiative provides training, fellowships, and funding opportunities to young leaders, and serves as a platform to address the region's key issue areas such as entrepreneurship, environmental protection, civic engagement, and education.
 Strategic Partnership: In November 2015, the leaders of the United States and ASEAN formally elevated their relationship to a Strategic Partnership. The U.S.-ASEAN partnership addresses shared challenges on a diverse range of issues - from combating terrorism and pandemic disease, to upholding international law and standards in the South China Sea and in cyberspace, to taking meaningful action on climate change, inclusive economic growth, and trafficking-in-persons. The United States is committed to the Asia-Pacific and to ASEAN as an essential pillar of the region.
 Sunnylands Summit: During the U.S.-ASEAN Summit in Kuala Lumpur in November 2015, President Obama invited leaders from 10 ASEAN member states to attend a special summit in the United States. The Summit, held in Sunnylands, California, on February 15–16, 2016, was the first-ever standalone U.S.-ASEAN summit, and marked a watershed year for both ASEAN and for the U.S.-ASEAN strategic partnership.
 U.S.-ASEAN Connect: U.S.-ASEAN Connect is a U.S. government initiative that was announced by President Obama at the U.S.-ASEAN Summit in Sunnylands, CA, in 2016. It aims to strengthen United States' economic engagement with ASEAN. Strong economic ties are at the core of the United States and ASEAN's decades-long partnership. ASEAN countries collectively comprise the fourth-largest trading partner for the United States. U.S.-ASEAN Connect aims to build on existing efforts to support ASEAN's economic integration, as a more integrated ASEAN will strengthen the region's rules-based, open economic order.
 U.S. Department of Defense Policy Board: On 29 January 2021, Hachigian along with Madeleine Albright and Henry Kissinger were appointed to the U.S. Department of Defense Policy Board.
Ambassador Hachigian also co-founded WASA, Women Ambassadors Serving America, a group of over 170 current and former Ambassadors.

References

External links
Strategic Collaboration: How the United States Can Thrive as Other Powers Rise by Nina Hachigian and Mona Sutphen

U.S. Department of State Biography [https://www.state.gov/biographies/nina-hachigian/

The Special Representative for Subnational Diplomacy[https://www.state.gov/bureaus-offices/under-secretary-for-economic-growth-energy-and-the-environment/the-secretarys-office-of-global-partnerships/the-special-representative-for-subnational-diplomacy/

Year of birth missing (living people)
Living people
Ambassadors of the United States to ASEAN
American expatriates in Indonesia
American people of Armenian descent
Stanford University alumni
Yale University alumni
American women ambassadors
Ambassadors of the United States
21st-century American women